Ectoedemia festivitatis is a moth of the family Nepticulidae. It is found in Nepal, China (Yunnan) and northern Vietnam (Fan Si Pan). It is probably more widespread in south-eastern Asia. The habitat consists of secondary or degraded forest or shrub vegetation in mountainous areas.

Description
The wingspan is 4.0-6.6 mm. Adults are on wing in August, October and from January to March. There are two or more generations per year.

Biology
The larvae feed on shrubby species of Hypericum species (St. John's worts), including Hypericum beanii, H. henryii, H. hookerianum, H. uralum, and possibly H. petiolulatum and H. oblongifolium. They mine the leaves of their host plant. The mine consists of a very long, narrow, and sinuous gallery, often following the leaf margin, with black to brown linear frass, abruptly widening into a blotch with scattered brown frass, usually concentrated in the centre and adhering to the upper epidermis. The later mine is swollen. The larva spins a cocoon inside a prepared silken tunnel, which leads to an exit slit, which the larva makes prior to spinning its cocoon.

References

Nepticulidae
Moths of Asia
Moths described in 2008